Ledricka Thierry is a Democratic member of the Louisiana House of Representatives, representing the 40th district. In 2011, Thierry introduced a bill to prohibit convicted child sex predators from using social network sites.

References

1978 births
Living people
People from Opelousas, Louisiana
Democratic Party members of the Louisiana House of Representatives
Women state legislators in Louisiana
Southern University alumni
Southern University Law Center alumni
Louisiana lawyers
African-American state legislators in Louisiana
21st-century African-American people
21st-century African-American women
20th-century African-American people
20th-century African-American women